Hafiz Abubakar (born 22 November 1947) is a Nigerian politician, academic and a professor of nutrition science at Bayero University, Kano and he was the deputy governor of Kano State between 2015 and 2018.

Hafiz was sworn-in as the deputy governor of Kano State along with Abdullahi Umar Ganduje as governor on 29 May 2015. Hafiz resigned on 5 August 2018 citing internal differences and humiliation by the governor. He thereafter joined the Peoples Democratic Party and then defected to the People's Redemption Party upon his inability to secure the governorship ticket of the Peoples Democratic Party. finally he returned to the All Progressive Congress on 20 December 2018.

References

1967 births
Living people
21st-century Nigerian politicians
Politicians from Kano
Politicians from Kano State
People from Kano
Deputy Governors of Kano State
All Progressives Congress politicians
Nigerian Muslims